Lucien Georges Mazan (18 October 1882 – 20 December 1917) was a French racing cyclist (pseudonym: Lucien Petit-Breton), known as the first two-time winner of the Tour de France.

He was born in Plessé, Loire-Atlantique, a part of Brittany, now part of Pays de la Loire. When he was six he moved with his parents to Buenos Aires, Argentina, where he took the nationality. His cycling career started when he won a bike in a lottery at the age of sixteen. As his father wanted him to do a 'real' job, he adapted the nickname Lucien Breton for races, to deceive his father. Later he changed it to Petit-Breton, because there already was another cyclist called Lucien Breton.

Professional career

His first notable victory was the track cycling championship of Argentina but in 1902 he was drafted in the French Army and he moved back to France. Two years later in 1904 he won the Bol d'Or track event at the second attempt, having finished second the previous year. In 1905 he broke the world hour record on the Buffalo cycling track in Paris with 41.110 km. The same year he started road-racing and finished the Tour de France in an astonishing fifth overall. In 1906, he won the third Paris–Tours race and improved on his previous performance by finishing fourth in the Tour.

In 1907, he won the inaugural Milan–San Remo race before entering the Tour. However, by the end of stage five from Lyon to Grenoble, his chance of victory looked slim. Losing contact with the leading riders on the Col de Porte, he could only manage a tenth place, twenty eight minutes behind Emile Georget who won his third stage. However, with the points system, time was irrelevant, and he was still in second place. In the tenth stage, Georget illegally changed bicycles, and was placed last in the stage by the Tour jury, which cost him 44 points. This meant that Petit-Breton took over the lead, and with two stage wins, plus second and third places in eight other stages, he won the Tour with 47 points, 10 point ahead of second placed Gustave Garrigou and 27 points ahead of Georget in third.

He also won the Tour in 1908, becoming the first rider to win the Tour twice, after winning the Paris–Brussels race. As part of the all-conquering Peugeot team that took the first four places, Petit-Breton won the Tour even more easily with just 36 points, finishing outside the first four in just one stage. Behind him, team-mates Francois Faber and Georges Passerieu finished with 68 and 75 points respectively.

That was his last great victory. First World War ended his career. He joined the French army as a driver and died in 1917 when he crashed into a horse and cart which turned in front of him at the front near Troyes. The cart driver was said to be insensible through drink.

Before the war he had started a bicycle shop and high-quality bicycles bearing his name were made in Nantes until the 1960s.

In popular culture
The French TV series Les Brigades du Tigre was a popular crime drama focusing on an elite squad of police detectives in the early 20th century. In an episode broadcast in 1978 they are appointed to watch over the competitors of the 1908 Tour de France, two of whom have been killed by a man who opposes cycling on the claim that his son was killed in a riding accident. Jacques Giraud appears as Petit Breton who is determined to continue the event come what may and persuades the other hesitant cyclists to also continue on the grounds that they should not let him win without a fight. He himself is later assaulted by the man but defiantly continues the stage to the admiration of those present.

Career achievements

Major results

1906
Paris–Tours
1907
Milan–San Remo
Tour de France:
 Winner overall classification
Winner stages 9 and 11
1908
Tour de France:
 Winner overall classification
Winner stages 2, 7, 9, 11 and 14
Paris–Brussels
Tour of Belgium (including 4 stages)
1911
Giro d'Italia
Winner stage 5

Grand Tour general classification results timeline

External links

 
 
 
 

1882 births
1917 deaths
Cyclists from Loire-Atlantique
French emigrants to Argentina
Naturalized citizens of Argentina
Argentine male cyclists
French male cyclists
Tour de France winners
French Tour de France stage winners
French Giro d'Italia stage winners
French military personnel killed in World War I
Road incident deaths in France